South Sudan National Museum is a mobile community-based national museum in South Sudan.

The pilot phase was launched by UNESCO in 2014. The museum is in mobile form, visiting local communities in remote areas of the country. The museum collection consists of material presenting life stories, using photographs, video/audio recordings, and other objects.

See also
 List of museums in South Sudan

References

2014 establishments in South Sudan
Museums established in 2014
National Museum
National museums
Community museums